"Yeah Yeah" is a song by British house music duo Bodyrox, written as a collaboration with Jon Pearn, Nick Bridges and Luciana. It was popularised in clubs through a remix by British producer D. Ramirez, which became the backing for the radio edit, featuring Luciana. Released in October 2006, the song reached number two on the UK Singles Chart, becoming both Bodyrox's and Luciana's highest-charting single. It also charted in several other countries, including Australia, Belgium, Finland, Ireland and the Netherlands. In addition, it topped the UK Dance Singles Chart and peaked at number 15 on the US Billboard Dance Airplay chart in March 2007.

Music video
The music video is available in both a censored and an uncensored form. Both versions feature Luciana and an assortment of young adults in a dingy room. Euphemisms including the connecting of microphone cables, spilling of milk are subtly woven into both versions of the video, and they conclude with Luciana dousing the room with petrol and sparking a cigarette lighter.

As the music continues, the young adults become increasingly aroused and start to make out with each other if in pairs, or rub themselves if alone; in the uncensored version of the video, the behaviour extends into crotch clutching and bared breast fondling.

Usage in film
The song appears on the soundtrack to the 2007 American comedy film Kickin' It Old Skool.

Track listings
UK CD single
 "Yeah Yeah" (D. Ramirez radio edit)
 "Yeah Yeah" (D. Ramirez vocal club mix)
 "Yeah Yeah" (Electro club mix)
 "Yeah Yeah" (D. Ramirez instrumental)
 "Yeah Yeah" (video)

UK 12-inch single
A. "Yeah Yeah" (D. Ramirez vocal club mix)
B. "Yeah Yeah" (Fred Falke dub mix)

Australian CD single
 "Yeah Yeah" (D. Ramirez radio edit)
 "Yeah Yeah" (D. Ramirez vocal club mix)
 "Yeah Yeah" (Electro club mix)
 "Yeah Yeah" (D. Ramirez instrumental)

Charts

Weekly charts

Year-end charts

Certifications

Release history

2017 version
In 2016, Dave Audé released an updated version of "Yeah Yeah", this time billed as "Yeah Yeah 2017" and credited as Luciana and Dave Audé. This version reached number one on Billboards Dance Club Songs chart the week of 25 February 2017.

In a 16 February 2017 interview with Billboard, Luciana explained how she and Audé came up with the idea to remake the song. "I feel very blessed and grateful right now. I am literally doing high kicks around my kitchen table as we speak! 'Yeah Yeah' is the track that started everything for me. I have always felt so passionate about it, so when Dave Audé said to me, 'Let's do a new 2017 version,' I knew it had to be right, and I think we nailed it. This No. 1 feels like the icing on the cake for me."

Track listing
 "Yeah Yeah 2017" (Dave Aude Extended Remix) 
 "Yeah Yeah 2017" (Dave Aude Radio Mix) 
 "Yeah Yeah 2017" (Tom Staar Extended Remix)
 "Yeah Yeah 2017" (Tom Staar Remix)
 "Yeah Yeah 2017" (Alex Acosta Drums Remix) 
 "Yeah Yeah 2017" (Alex Acosta Dub) 
 "Yeah Yeah 2017" (Tom Budin Remix) 
 "Yeah Yeah 2017" (Tom Budin Radio Mix) 
 "Yeah Yeah 2017" (Pandaboyz Remix) 
 "Yeah Yeah 2017" (Pandaboyz Radio Mix)
 "Yeah Yeah 2017" (Chocolate Puma Remix)

References

2005 songs
2006 singles
2017 singles
Bodyrox songs
Songs written by Luciana Caporaso
Songs written by Nick Clow